TISFF may refer to:
Tehran International Short Film Festival
Tel Aviv International Student Film Festival